Operation Guerguerat was a military operation conducted by Morocco against Polisario, in the Western Sahara. It took place on 13 November 2020.

References 

Western Sahara conflict
2020 in Morocco